Bonaspeiini is a tribe of leafhoppers in the subfamily Deltocephalinae. Bonaspeiini is made up of 26 genera and over 125 species found throughout southern Africa. Many species are found in the fynbos biome.

Genera 
There are 26 described genera in the tribe Bonaspeiini:

References 

Deltocephalinae